New York's 34th State Senate district is one of 63 districts in the New York State Senate. It has  been represented by Democrat Alessandra Biaggi since 2019. 

Biaggi ran in 2018 for the Democratic nomination for New York State Senate in District 34. While only 32 years old, she ran against powerful longtime incumbent Jeffrey D. Klein, the number 2 Democrat in the NY Senate and the leader of the Independent Democratic Conference, who had held the seat for 14 years. Klein outspent Biaggi by a rate of 9-to-1, spending $2 million to her $200,000. Biaggi said: "The more people told me I couldn’t win, the more obsessed I became."

In a major upset, Biaggi defeated Klein in the primary, 54%-46%. She remarked: "It was a tough fight. And, I should also say, we should thank [Senator Klein] for his service. But his time is up.” Subsequently, on November 6, 2018, she defeated Republican Richard Ribustello 76.0%-14.9%, and was elected to the New York State Senate. At 32 years of age, she became one of the youngest women ever elected to the New York State Senate.

Geography
District 34 is located in the northeastern Bronx and southern Westchester County, including the neighborhoods of Spuyten Duyvil, Riverdale, Hunts Point, Castle Hill, Throggs Neck, Pelham Gardens, Pelham Parkway, City Island, and the town of Pelham.

The district overlaps with New York's 13th, 14th, 15th, and 16th congressional districts, and with the 78th, 80th, 81st, 82nd, 84th, 85th, 87th, 88th, and 89th districts of the New York State Assembly.

Recent election results

2020

2018

2016

2014

2012

Federal results in District 34

References

34